Jean Rivain (1883–1957) was a French political writer and journal editor. He was the co-founder of La Revue critique des idées et des livres.

Early life
Jean Rivain was born on 14 November 1883 in Paris, France.

Career
Rivain was a political writer and editor. He was the author of several books on French politics, where he championed nationalism and rejected socialism. He published a collection of letters addressed to Marshal Philippe Pétain in 1944.

Rivain was influenced by ideas of Charles Maurras and by Italian fascism. He even moved to Italy with his son to experience fascism, and called for closer relations between France and Italy. Meanwhile, he was the founder of the Cercle Joseph de Maistre, a think tank which promoted the ideas of French philosopher Joseph de Maistre. Furthermore, he argued that Georges Sorel's ideas on corporations and cooperatives were elitist.

Rivain was the co-founder of La Revue critique des idées et des livres, a journal associated with the Action Française, in 1908.
From 1908 Lucien Moreau and Jean Rivain were the key contributors to the review.

Death
Rivain died on 23 May 1957 in Auverse, Maine-et-Loire, France.

Works

References

Sources

1883 births
1957 deaths
Writers from Paris
French magazine editors
French political writers